Lucy Armstrong (born 2 September 1991) is a British composer based in London, who was appointed Fellow of Composition at the Guildhall School of Music and Drama, London in 2018.

Armstrong composed a chamber opera, Nadja's Song, for the Bergen National Opera which premiered in Bergen and was later performed at the Tête à Tête Opera Festival in London and in Bogotá.

She has composed for: Size Zero Opera, The Borealis Saxophone Quartet, The Piccadilly Symphony Orchestra, Psappha, RNCM Engage, The Royal Central School of Speech and Drama, The Meon Valley Orchestra, John Miller's Brazmataz, Gillian Blair, Erin Royer and A4 Brass. Her work has been performed in venues such as St Martin-in-the-Fields, The Lyric Theatre, The Bridgewater Hall, RADA Studios and St James Piccadilly and her music has been broadcast on BBC Radio 3.

Education 
Armstrong studied music at The University of Bristol.  She then studied composition at the Royal Northern College of Music under Adam Gorb and Gary Carpenter between 2013 and 2015 where she was awarded the Alan Rawsthorne Prize for Composition in 2015 and was highly commended in the RNCM Gold Medal competition. In 2017 and 2018 she then studied at the Guildhall School of Music and Drama with Julian Philips.

Selected works

Opera 
A Risk of Lobsters (2018; Chamber Opera)

Tale of the Tell-Tale Tail (2017; Chamber Opera)

Nadja’s Song (2015; Chamber Opera)

The Library (2014; Chamber Opera)

Wind band 
Life is a Daring Adventure or Nothing (2015; Wind Band)

Marine Overture (2012; Wind Band)

Chamber music 
The Other Dust (2016, alto saxophone, tenor saxophone and piano)

The Singing Fish (2016; alto saxophone and piano)

Space Adventure (2015; percussion and loop pedal)

SAME SAME BUT DIFFERENT (2016; Saxophone Quartet)

Attraction (2015; solo piano)

DARTH MAHLER (2015; solo trumpet)

REPULSION (2015; Brass quartet) 

Melodrama for Saxophone and Piano  (2014; soprano saxophone and piano)

Jolt (2013; Saxophone Quartet)

Vocal music 
Masculine/Feminine (2015; baritone and piano)

Cheese! (2015, Vocal Octet)

Interior (2014; mezzo-soprano and piano)

References

External links 
 Official Website

English composers
Alumni of the University of Bristol
Women opera composers
English opera composers
1991 births
Living people
Alumni of the Royal Northern College of Music
21st-century English women musicians
Women classical composers
20th-century British composers
20th-century English women musicians
British women composers
20th-century women composers